Thomas Splitt was a Scottish professional association footballer who played as a full back.

References

People from Lochgelly
Scottish footballers
Association football defenders
Dunfermline Athletic F.C. players
Cowdenbeath F.C. players
Burnley F.C. players
Halifax Town A.F.C. players
Nelson F.C. players
Scottish Football League players
English Football League players
Year of death missing
Burnley F.C. wartime guest players
Year of birth missing